is a Japanese footballer currently playing as a midfielder for YSCC Yokohama.

Personal life
Wakizaka is the brother of Japanese international footballer Yasuto Wakizaka.

Career statistics

Club
.

Notes

References

1998 births
Living people
Sportspeople from Yokohama
Association football people from Kanagawa Prefecture
Niigata University of Health and Welfare alumni
Japanese footballers
Association football midfielders
J3 League players
YSCC Yokohama players